Drew Helleson (born March 26, 2001) is an American ice hockey defenseman for the San Diego Gulls of the American Hockey League (AHL) as a prospect for the Anaheim Ducks of the National Hockey League (NHL). Helleson was drafted 47th overall by the Colorado Avalanche in the 2019 NHL Entry Draft.

Playing career
During the 2020–21 season, Helleson recorded four goals and 11 assists in 22 games for Boston College. Following the season he was named Hockey East Best Defensive Defenseman, First Team All-Hockey East and Second Team AHCA All-American.

Having just completed his junior 2021–22 season with the Eagles, posting career-best marks of 21 assists and 25 points through 32 games, Helleson's rights along with a 2023 second-round draft pick were traded by the Avalanche to the Anaheim Ducks, in exchange for Josh Manson, on March 14, 2022. The next day Helleson ended his collegiate career by signing a three-year, entry-level contract with the Ducks.

International play

Helleson represented the United States at the 2019 IIHF World U18 Championships, where he recorded three assists in seven games and won a bronze medal. He represented the United States at the 2021 World Junior Ice Hockey Championships where he recorded two goals and two assists in seven games and won a gold medal. On January 13, 2022, Helleson was named to Team USA's roster to represent the United States at the 2022 Winter Olympics.

Career statistics

Regular season and playoffs

International

Awards and honors

References

External links
 

2001 births
Living people
AHCA Division I men's ice hockey All-Americans
Boston College Eagles men's ice hockey players
Colorado Avalanche draft picks
Ice hockey players from Minnesota
People from Farmington, Minnesota
Ice hockey players at the 2022 Winter Olympics
Olympic ice hockey players of the United States
San Diego Gulls (AHL) players
USA Hockey National Team Development Program players